The Ranks and insignia of the Latvian National Armed Forces are the military insignia used by the Latvian National Armed Forces.

Historically the Land Forces wore collar insignia. Today shoulder boards are worn by almost all personnel of the NAF, save for the Staff Battalion, which uses a modified form of the old collar insignia.

Current ranks

Commissioned officer ranks
The following are the current insignia of commissioned officers.

Other ranks
The rank insignia of non-commissioned officers and enlisted personnel.

Historic ranks

References

External links
 

Latvia
Military of Latvia